Jacek Magdziński (Portuguese: Jacek; born 20 September 1986) is a Polish former professional footballer who played as a forward. Besides Poland, he also played in England and Angola.

Career
Magdzinski started his senior career with Dyskobolia Grodzisk Wielkopolski. After that, he played for Arka Nowa Sól, Germania Egestorf/Langreder, Flota Świnoujście, Zawisza Bydgoszcz, Chojniczanka Chojnice, Gwardia Koszalin, Farnborough, Billericay Town, Wealdstone, and Walton & Hersham. In 2014, he signed for Puszcza Niepołomice in the Polish I liga, where he made eleven appearances and scored zero goals.

In 2017 he moved to Sagrada Esperança in Angola.

References

External links 
 Jacek Magdziński: "Angolans have a lot of looseness in everyday life. They have time for everything, they don't wear the watch in their hands" (INTERVIEW) 
 African stories by Jacek Magdziński - memories from Angola 
 Footballer from the region makes a career in Angola [PHOTOS]
 Jacek Magdziński for 2x45: We have hundreds of better players than me, but few could experience what I do in Angola
 Jacek bets on the trophy for best scorer

Living people
1986 births
Polish footballers
Association football forwards
Flota Świnoujście players
Zawisza Bydgoszcz players
Gwardia Koszalin players
Puszcza Niepołomice players
Chojniczanka Chojnice players
Farnborough F.C. players
Billericay Town F.C. players
Polish expatriate footballers
Polish expatriate sportspeople in Germany
Expatriate footballers in Germany
Polish expatriate sportspeople in England
Expatriate footballers in England
Polish expatriate sportspeople in Angola
Expatriate footballers in Angola